Francis Joseph McNally (March 19, 1907 – February 5, 1993) was a professional American football offensive lineman in the National Football League. He played four seasons for the Chicago Cardinals (1931–1934).

1907 births
1993 deaths
People from Pershing County, Nevada
Players of American football from Nevada
American football centers
Saint Mary's Gaels football players
Chicago Cardinals players